Ileza is a rural locality (a settlement) in Ustyansky District, Arkhangelsk Oblast, Russia. The population was 1,098 as of 2010. There are 27 streets.

Geography 
It is located 54 km east from Oktyabrsky.

References 

Rural localities in Ustyansky District